Grace is the second studio album released by Blue band-member and singer-songwriter Simon Webbe. The album was released on 13 November 2006. After entering the UK Albums Chart at #40 based on downloads only, the album peaked at #11 upon its physical release. In Ireland, it failed to chart inside the Irish Top 100. The album was released to a similar lack of interest in Asia, South Africa and Australia. It sold considerably less than Webbe's first album, though managed to sell 100,000 copies in the UK, being certified Gold by the BPI. In certain Europe countries the album charted higher than his debut on first week however spent less time on the charts overall and in sales.

A special edition of the album was released on 14 August 2007, containing four extra tracks. The special edition includes "Ride The Storm", the lead single from the film Fantastic Four: Rise of the Silver Surfer. Four singles were released from the album: "Coming Around Again" (which peaked at #12 on the UK Singles Chart), "My Soul Pleads for You" (which peaked at #45 on the UK Singles Chart), "Seventeen" (which peaked at #171 on the UK Singles Chart, based on downloads only), and "Grace"/"Ride the Storm" (which peaked at #36 and #14 on the UK Singles Chart respectively).

Track listings

Charts and certifications

Weekly charts

Certifications

References

2006 albums
Simon Webbe albums
EMI Records albums
Innocent Records albums
Albums produced by Stargate